Off the derech (pronounced: , meaning: path) (OTD) is a Yeshiva-English expression used to describe a Jew who has left an Orthodox Jewish community. Despite its negative connotation in insinuating that the exiter has left a single acceptable path, the term has been reclaimed and used by some OTD individuals and groups to self describe. "Off the derech" as a term applies to a broad range of formerly Orthodox Jewish individuals including those who leave Hasidic communities, other types of Haredi communities, and Modern Orthodox communities, and whose new lifestyles can be other forms of Judaism, or no religion at all.

Leaving the Haredi community is largely reported to be a hard experience emotionally, socially and financially, often involving multiple risks and losses. There is a wide and varied array of reasons given for leaving. A significant number of studies seek to examine these reasons, and the combination of their findings suggests that exiting is a complex, multifaceted phenomenon which can be defined in several ways: disaffiliation as immigration, disaffiliation as apostasy, liberation from a coercive group, and standing for one’s identity. A common denominator between all of the narratives is an intensity in the individuals' desire to leave, underscored by their readiness to pay the high price involved. 

The OTD phenomenon is of interest to Orthodox Jews, non-Orthodox Jews, members of the general public, and the exiters themselves, bringing forth a variety of representations and narratives which are expressed in forms of memoirs, podcasts, studies, film & TV, and opinion pieces.

Aggregations of ex-Orthodox individuals may comprise a social movement. Reports show the rates of attrition from Orthodox Judaism in the US and the UK to be at 13%-22% between people under 35 years old. Similar or bigger trends in leaving religion exist in Islam, the LDS movement, and evangelical Christianity.

Terminology

Pre-20th Century
Within religious Jewish verbiage, the term "apostate" (or "meshumad") is traditionally reserved for those who exchange the Jewish faith for another religion, especially Christianity or Islam, which is seen as an active renunciation of Jewish identity, whereas being a secularist Jew is not. Jewish communities did not historically have a term for those who left all faith, save for the term "epikoros" defining an "informed heretic". When individuals left to join a secular movement in the 19th and early 20th centuries, their secularity was often referred to by the name of the party they had joined. For example, those who left Orthodox observance to join the Zionist movement were simply referred to as Zionists, which implied a connection to both Zionism and secularity.

Though people have left religious Judaism throughout history, the term "off the derech" is anachronistic if used to describe an individual who lived before the 20th century. The contemporary phenomenon of OTD shares some similarities with the Haskalah movement in its disaffection with traditional modes of religion, its secularization and interest in secular education, and in experimenting with a secular Jewish culture. Like Haskalah, its members tend to be secularists and religious decentralists. However, sociological factors between pre-20th-century leavers and contemporary leavers are significantly different.

Contemporary
With the rise of the contemporary trend of individuals exiting of Orthodoxy, in seeking to describe one who had left, Orthodox Jews coined the term "off the derech", the term denoting that the individual had left what they considered to be the one true path. The term "apikorus" is still often used jointly for outspoken atheists and agnostics.

Some OTD individuals and groups have reclaimed the term, and often use it to describe themselves despite the previous negative connotations. In using it upon themselves, some simply make use of it as a convenient shorthand, while others place deliberate positive connotations on the term. "Off the derech" can be used as a liberating phrase in the sense of being off a narrow and previously restricting path, and the acronym OTD can be used to mean "on the derech", implying that these individuals have found their own paths. Within the broad range of OTD individuals and groups, there is a difference of opinion on whether it is better to reclaim the term or to use a new one altogether. One alternative is XO, a term coined by an OTD individual to signify "ex-Orthodox" while also playing on a term for "love".

This term, loosely translated as "leaving in question," plays on "returning in repentance", the popular term for those who move in the other direction by becoming Orthodox after being raised without Orthodoxy.

Demographics

United States
A 2013 survey on American Jews conducted by the Pew Research Center which included more than 500 Orthodox participants, found that 52% of Jewish adults who were raised Orthodox, were no longer Orthodox. When subdivided by age, it found that it was 17% for those under the age of 30, 59% for those aged 50–64, and 78% for those aged 65 and above. Some experts think that the higher attrition rate in the older age groups is possibly "a period effect in which people who came of age during the 1950s, 1960s and 1970s left Orthodoxy in large numbers." A subsequent 2020 study found the attrition rate declined at 33%.

United Kingdom
The JPR's preliminary research report from the 2013 National Jewish Community Survey, showed that 36% of participants who were raised Central Orthodox, were no longer Orthodox (an additional 6% had gone "right" to Haredi Orthodoxy). There was no data available to demonstrate shifts in the British Haredi community.

Reasons for leaving 
One study by Roni Berger found four milestones common in the narratives of study participants: 1) initial questioning; 2) growing doubts; 3) beginning to share selectively with a small group of trusted others; 4) revealing a new and altered identity. This process of religious disaffiliation is echoed by Helen Rose Fuchs Ebaugh (1988) in an article about ex-nuns. In the case of nuns, Ebuagh says the process is 1) first doubts; 2) seeking and weighing role alternatives; 3) a turning point; 4) establishing an ex-role identity.

Lynn Davidman's book acknowledges the often messy process of leaving, including a period of "passing" when individuals would move between two worlds. This period is characterized by confusion, doubts, depression, and defiance, but also by self-confidence and courage to leave the regimented world they grew up in and begin to live in another world. In addition, because of the community's insularity, some people who experience the first stages of doubt, confusion, and depression don't see a way out and instead reconcile themselves to remaining.

An individual's decision to discontinue practicing Orthodox Judaism is likely based on the presence of one or more of three key causes: emotional, intellectual, or implementational issues. Nishma Research carried out a survey of OTD individuals in 2016, which recorded a widely-varied and complex set of reasons people give for leaving, and the process in which they do so. The Nishma study, as well as a study by Faranak Margolese, who wrote the book, Off the Derech: Why Observant Jews Leave Judaism; How to Respond to the Challenge, came to the conclusion that: "Most formerly observant Jews today seem to have left, not [or, in the Nishma study - not so much] because the outside world pulled them in, but, rather, because the observant one pushed them out. They experienced Judaism as a source of pain ... so they did what was natural: go in the other direction.".

These and other studies point to the social and emotional aspect of Haredi Judaism, and individuals' feelings of being silenced, marginalized, or ignored within the rigid social structure.

Some selected reasons revealed by these studies include bad behavior and perceived hypocrisy in the community, especially from community leaders; oppressive community norms; experiencing religious observance as a condition for parents' or teachers' love or approval; experiencing molestation, rape, or other sexual abuse; difficulty reconciling strict interpretations of Torah and Talmud with knowledge of natural science; disbelief that the Torah or Jewish path is correct.

Sexual abuse is indeed found to be reported among OTD individuals at a much higher rate than among the overall Orthodox and general population. According to a study by Rosmarin et al. (2018), compared to currently Orthodox and those never affiliated with Orthodox Judaism, formerly Orthodox people were more than four times as likely to report involuntary childhood sex. J Engelman et al.'s 2019 study on OTD adults reports that 25% of male respondents and 30% of female respondents said that they had experienced sexual abuse within Orthodox Jewish communities, though the questioning was not specific enough to determine the prevalence of sexual abuse in minors.

Orthodox views of OTD people 
The family and the Orthodox community at large see attrition from Orthodoxy as a serious problem for Jews as it threatens the Orthodox population of Jews, causes assimilation, and breaks the intergenerational chain of the Orthodox traditions and laws for living. Attitudes of Orthodox individuals and leaders toward those who have left range from considering them heretics to be shunned and/or mourned as dead (the latter having fallen out of vogue more recently), to regarding them as being wayward people in pain who must be shown love; showing love to those perceived as being in pain is most often seen in regard to teens. In the view of Haredi leadership and Haredi psychologists, questions of faith are a symptom of abuse, depression, anxiety, addiction or life problems, and through addressing these issues they are likely to return to their former beliefs. For this reason, when a person loses faith, Haredi leadership involves these experts to treat them for emotional problems, such that these individuals are pathologized for their inability or unwillingness to conform. "At risk", a term generally used for minors and adolescents in terms of protection and physical or mental risk, was adapted by Orthodox people to include those at a "spiritual risk" involving a decline in observance, a decline in spiritual beliefs, and violation of socio-cultural norms and rules, elements which can manifest into leaving Orthodox Judaism. 

Steinberg's study (2021), which focused on OTD individuals who originate from the Yeshivish (Lithuanian Haredi) sect, concludes that "In the Yeshivish world it appears that [the family] remaining close, not cutting off a child because they are OTD, is a pattern and not an exception". In a Mishpacha interview with Shimon Schneebalg, a Hasidic Rabbi in Israel, the Rabbi addressed parents of OTD children, encouraging them to fully accept that their child has taken "a different path", and to love their child unconditionally. In 2018, a remarkable video of Rabbi Gershon Eidelstein circulated, in which he was filmed saying that parents of an OTD son should not reprimand their child for bringing a girlfriend into the home or lighting a cigarette on shabbos.

Agudath Israel of America, a leading ultra-Orthodox organization, addresses the topic of individuals leaving Orthodox Judaism often. At their national conventions in 2015 and 2016, they addressed the topic in panels titled "OTD: Why Do They Leave? And What Can We Do About It?", and "Diving Off The Derech: The Emerging Adult At Risk Phenomenon".

For those who leave and are married with children, the community tends to embrace the spouse left behind and help raise funds for legal support to help that person retain custody of the children, sometimes accomplished through community emergency fundraising appeals which are backed by the Haredi community leadership. One such event in 2016 in Stamford Hill, London was graced by the presence of senior rebbes who had flown in from Israel to attend, which helped to attract a reported 1,500 strong attendance, each of whom were asked for a minimum donation of £500. A flyer calling to the event contained a letter from Rabbi Ephraim Padwa, spiritual head of the UOHC, in which he wrote: "To our great pain, and our misfortune, our community finds itself in a terrible situation – 17 of our pure and holy children where one of the parents, God rescue them, have gone out into an evil culture, and want to drag their children after them."

Orthodox leaders and parents have set up organizations to counsel those whose relatives are OTD. Some of the organizations include Project Yes, MASK (Mothers and Fathers Aligned Saving Kids). Additionally, Shabbatons, groups, and events are organized to support parents dealing with an OTD child. Rabbis and leaders also provide support and advice for children whose parents have left Orthodoxy.

Haredi community members interviewed by the BBC "argue that the stories of people who leave cast the community - a vulnerable minority at risk of anti-semitic attack - in a bad light and that it’s unfair." A hashtag trend #MyOrthodoxLife followed the release of the 2021 reality TV show My Unorthodox Life, and similar campaigns often arise when OTD narratives are in the spotlight.

Post-disaffiliation issues 
Multiple hardships and losses are involved in one's process of disaffiliation from Orthodox Jewish communities, especially from Haredi Orthodoxy, which can include loss of family, loss of employment, divorce, loss of custody of children, and loss of community and social structure. Additionally, those who leave must adjust and acculturate to new ways of life and thinking outside of their communities of origin.

Psychological 
Individuals who leave ultra-Orthodox Judaism often face rejection from friends and family members. This knowledge often leads individuals who have doubts to first try to reconcile their doubts, in order to avoid the risk of losing family and friends. These individuals are generally pathologized by community leaders and experts and this attitude can often cause them to doubt their own sanity for having questions. At this stage, individuals often experience anxiety and depression. Some contemplate, attempt, or commit suicide. Faigy Mayer's 2015 suicide was covered by some media outlets, which led to a spate of think-pieces about OTD suicides. Although reports of a higher than average suicide rate among OTD have been heard, experts have highlighted that they are anecdotal, with no statistical data available to back up the claims. Leaving any faith-based community often has traumatic effects; for many, losing a lifelong sense of reliance and security through believing in divine providence can be a difficult adjustment. OTD individuals also struggle with ingrained ideas about God's punishment, often leading to extreme feelings of guilt. Guilt among questioning individuals sometimes leads them to commit self-harm as a way of punishing themselves for perceived wrongs towards God, family and community.

While psychological effects can be overwhelming in the initial years after leaving, the majority of OTD individuals report satisfaction with their choices. In Engelman's 2019 survey, 59% reported that they accomplished the goals they expected by leaving; 30% reported that they somewhat accomplished those goals; and 11% reported that they did not accomplish those goals.

Social 
Leaving the community entails adjusting to a secular world where attitudes to many subjects are different and social life works differently. Some find it hard to adapt to aspects of the general public's day to day lifestyle, which can leave them with feelings of inadequacy and alienation. Leaving a close-knit community where every member of the community is taken care of is often financially challenging as well. Individuals who leave ultra-Orthodox communities often have difficulty maintaining contact with families who may disapprove of their choices. To counteract the feelings of isolation and alienation, many individuals form groups of friends who get together for Shabbat dinners and other practices with cultural significance.

Some Orthodox Jews remain in the community despite losing their faith. In the 2016 Nishma survey of OTD individuals, 33% of the respondents reported that they were posing as religious. These people are sometimes referred to as Reverse Marranos, double-lifers, in the closet OTD, or Orthoprax Jews. The decision to stay is often influenced by fear of being ostracized and having to rebuild community, or by fear of losing one's spouse and/or children. Many of these individuals join online communities of people of OTD experience, often using pseudonyms to avoid being outed. 39% of double-lifers say it is likely they will leave their community at some point.

Some OTD individuals have become activists by founding, or volunteering within, organizations which advocate for specific changes within the community. Some examples include ZAAKAH, which works to prevent child sexual abuse; YAFFED, which advocates for basic secular education among ultra-Orthodox Jews especially amid Hasidim; and JQY, which focuses on LGBTQ+ causes.

Ex-Orthodox organizations 
Many formerly Orthodox individuals seek community and discussion about their former beliefs and new lives in online and in-person groups. Ad hoc OTD communities have developed, with the most established being Footsteps, founded in New York in December 2003 to help ultra-Orthodox Jews who want to explore the option of leaving their insular communities.  is its equivalent in Israel, Mavar in the UK, and Gesher for the UK as well as for Europe in general. Project Makom was founded in July 2014, and "helps former and questioning Charedi Jews find their place in Orthodoxy".
Informal communities have also developed on websites, blogs, and Facebook groups.

In popular culture 
Recently, a number of stories of people leaving Orthodox Judaism have gained a degree of fame in the general public's eye.

See also 
 Apostasy in Judaism
 Baal teshuva, a Jew raised in a non-observant family who becomes observant as an adult 
 Ex-Mormon
 Ex-Muslims 
 Exvangelical 
 Frum, to describe observant Jews
 Heresy in Judaism
 Jewish atheism
 Jewish Buddhists
 Jewish secularism
 Reverse Marranos

References

Further reading 
 Margolese, Faranak, Off the Derech: Why Observant Jews Leave Judaism; How to Respond to the Challenge, Devora Publishing, 2005.
 
 Winston, Hella,  Unchosen: The Hidden Lives of Hasidic Rebels, Beacon Press, 2006.
 Nishma Research (June 2016) conducted the first large-scale quantitative study ever of this group, with a survey of 885 people who have left Orthodoxy, "Survey of Those Who Have Left Orthodoxy"
 Fader, Ayala, Hidden Heretics: Jewish Doubt in the Digital Age, Princeton University Press, 2020.
 Cappell, Ezra and Lang, Jessica, Off the Derech: Leaving Orthodox Judaism, SUNY Press, 2020.

Disengagement from religion
Heresy in Judaism
Jewish atheism
Jewish society
Orthodox Judaism
Secular Jewish culture
Anti-Orthodox Judaism sentiment